The Poll Tax of 1379 was granted to the King by the lords, commoners and clergy of England in order to finance the Hundred Years' War. It was graduated according to each taxpayers rank or social position, thereby avoiding dissatisfaction based on inequality and unfairness. The schedule of charge for this tax therefore contained a classification of the taxpayers. This poll tax was expected to net over £50,000, but the revenue never reached half that sum.

Background
The fiscal exigencies of the Hundred Years' War compelled the Bad Parliament of 1377 to grant to the King a tax of four pence or a groat to be taken from the goods of each man and woman in the kingdom over fourteen, with the exception of real beggars. In addition the clergy granted a tax of 12 pence from every beneficed person, and a groat from every other religious person, with the exception of mendicant friars. Special commissions were appointed to collect the tax, and the county sheriffs were ordered to aid with the collection. The tax on laymen netted £22,607, 2 s., 6d. paid by 1,376, 442 persons, although the records of County Durham and Cheshire are missing.

The war continued with French attack on the southern coast of England, the towns of Dartmouth, Plymouth, Winchelsea and others suffered. The first parliament of Richard II therefore in 1377 granted for two years a tax of two fifteenths on movables without cities and boroughs and two tenths within. In addition parliament added a grant of customs subsidy on wool, woolfells and leather for three years. It also granted for one year six pence on the pound in goods imported and exported. The second parliament of Richard II granted in 1378 a tax of one fifteenth and a half on movables without cities and boroughs and one tenth and a half within. It also continued the previous customs on wool and merchandise a year longer. This grant did not produce the sum of money required for the war, and the third parliament of Richard II  repealed in and replaced it with a poll tax that would be easier and faster to collect.

Poll Tax of 1379
The new poll tax of 1379 was graduated according to each taxpayer's rank or social position, thereby avoiding dissatisfaction based on inequality and unfairness. The schedule of charge for this tax therefore contained a classification of taxpayers. It is divided into four groups: the first is based on rank, the second on occupation (men of law), the third on civic hierarchy, and the fourth other men. Two commissions were appointed, one to assess, and the other to collect. Later in 1379 reassessment commissions were appointed. This poll tax was expected to net over £50,000, but the revenue never reached half that sum. In 1379 the Convocations of Canterbury and York met and granted an almost identical poll tax for the clergy.

Schedule

References

Citations

Cited literature
 Byrne, Sandie (2020). Poetry and Class. Springer Switzerland.
 Dowell, Stephen (1884). A History of Taxation and Taxes in England. Vol. 1. Taxation, from the earliest times to the Civil War.  Longmand, Green & Co.
 Fenwick, Carolyn C. (1998). The Poll Taxes of 1377, 1379, and 1381. Part 1. Bedfordshire-Leicestershire. Oxford University Press.
 Mackie, Frederick Peter (1998). The clerical population of the Province of York: An edition of the clerical poll tax enrolments 1377-1381. Ph.D. thesis. Department of History. University of York.
 Mortimer, Thomas (1764). A New History of England. J. Wilson & J. Fell, Paternoster-Row.

Poll Tax of 1379
1379 in England